WICC (600 kHz) is a commercial AM radio station in Bridgeport, Connecticut, owned by Connoisseur Media.  It airs as a news/talk radio format featuring local shows with Melissa Sheketoff, Lisa Wexler and Paul Pacelli. Nationally syndicated programs include Erick Erickson, Dave Ramsey, Ben Shapiro and Red Eye Radio.  Weekends feature shows on safe money, Italian music, and the Oh Wow Oldies Show, featuring DJs Rob Ray ("the Music Professor"), Chris Williams, Storm N. Norman, and Andy Madison. Most hours begin with world and national news from NBC News Radio. WICC was formerly a member of the New York Yankees Radio Network and formerly aired Sacred Heart University athletics.

The WICC studios are located on Wheelers Farms Road in Milford; the station's transmitter is on Pleasure Beach in Bridgeport on a peninsula extending into Long Island Sound. WICC's signal is heard in much of Southern Connecticut and reaches into Long Island, New York.  Programming is also heard on FM translator 107.3 W297CP, and using an HD Radio, on sister stations 107.9 WEBE-HD2 and 99.1 WPLR-HD2.

History
WICC is Bridgeport's first radio station and one of the first in Connecticut. Its call letters stand for "Industrial Capital of Connecticut," which described Bridgeport throughout the early and mid-20th century.

In the early days, as radio assignments were being formalized, WICC broadcast from various places on the AM dial, including 1060 kHz, 1400 kHz, 1130 kHz, 1190 kHz and 1430 kHz until finally settling at 600 kHz in 1930.

Before March 1932, WICC affiliated with the Yankee Network. The station became an affiliate of the CBS Radio Network on September 25, 1932.

When network programming shifted from radio to television in the 1950s, WICC became a full service, middle of the road station, featuring popular music, news, talk and sports. Notably, Bob Crane was a host and Disc jockey from late 1951 through 1956.
In the 1970s and 80s, the music moved closer to an Adult Top 40 sound.  

Over time, as music listening shifted from AM to FM radio, WICC added more talk programming, becoming an all-talk station in the 1990s.  In 1992, WICC was acquired by Cumulus Media, which became one of the largest owners of radio stations in the U.S.

On April 15, 2019, Cumulus Media announced that WICC and co-owned 107.9 WEBE would be swapped to Connoisseur Media, which began operating the stations under a local marketing agreement (LMA) on May 1. The swap was consummated on June 26, 2019.

References

External links
WICC600 official website

ICC (AM)
Mass media in Bridgeport, Connecticut
Mass media in Fairfield County, Connecticut
RKO General
News and talk radio stations in the United States
Radio stations established in 1926
Connoisseur Media radio stations
1926 establishments in Connecticut